Paul Prashad (born 23 September 1967) was a Canadian cricketer, who played his last international game on 17 October 2000. He was a right-handed batsman. His first known game for Canada was on 11 June 1986 against the USA in the 1986 ICC Trophy in England. He was one of Canada's most successful batsmen in ICC Trophy, scoring more runs in the tournament than any other Canadian batsman. He also has scored three of Canada's centuries in the tournament, including the highest two scores, the highest being an unbeaten 164 against Papua New Guinea.

References
Cricket Archive player profile
Cricket Archive - Canada's top ICC Trophy run scorers
Cricket Archive - Top individual scores in ICC Trophy for Canada

1967 births
Living people
Canadian cricketers
Guyanese cricketers
Cricketers at the 1998 Commonwealth Games
Canadian people of Indian descent
People from East Berbice-Corentyne
Guyanese emigrants to Canada
Indo-Guyanese people
Commonwealth Games competitors for Canada